József Braun (also known as József Barna; 26 February 1901 – 20 February 1943) was a Hungarian Olympic footballer who played as a half back. Braun began his career in Hungary before finishing it in the American Soccer League. He earned 27 caps, scoring 11 goals, with the Hungarian national team. After retiring from playing, he coached for several years. Braun was killed in 1943 in a Nazi forced labor camp.

Early and personal life
He was Jewish. His nephew is András Kepes journalist, documentary filmmaker and author.

Club career
Braun played as youth with VAC Budapest. In 1916, he signed for MTK Budapest in the Hungarian League, where he played primarily as a right wing back. In 1919, he was selected as the Hungarian Player of the Year. During his years with MTK Budapest, Braun won nine Hungarian championships and two Hungarian cups. He retired from playing in 1925 after suffering from multiple injuries.

In 1929, he moved to the United States, where he attempted a comeback with the Brooklyn Hakoah of the American Soccer League. He played 17 games before moving to the Brooklyn Wanderers in the fall of 1929. He played 11 games during the 1929–30 season, then retired permanently.

National team

After making his international debut at 17 years of age, Braun earned 27 caps, scoring 11 goals, with the Hungarian national team.  His first came in a 6 October 1918 victory over Austria. His last came in a 3–3 tie with Poland in December 1926.

He was a member of the Hungarian soccer team at the 1924 Summer Olympics, where he played two games.

Coach
Braun later coached ŠK Slovan Bratislava from 1935-38.

Death in Nazi camp
Drafted as a Jew into forced labour in support of the Hungarian Army in the Eastern Front in World War II, Braun was killed in 1943 in a Nazi forced labor camp in the Ukraine.

References

1901 births
1943 deaths
Footballers from Budapest
Jewish Hungarian sportspeople
Hungarian footballers
Jewish footballers
Hungary international footballers
Olympic footballers of Hungary
Footballers at the 1924 Summer Olympics
MTK Budapest FC players
Hungarian expatriate footballers
Expatriate soccer players in the United States
American Soccer League (1921–1933) players
Brooklyn Hakoah players
Hungarian expatriate sportspeople in the United States
Brooklyn Wanderers players
Hungarian football managers
Hungarian expatriate football managers
ŠK Slovan Bratislava managers
Expatriate football managers in Czechoslovakia
Hungarian expatriate sportspeople in Czechoslovakia
MTK Budapest FC managers
Association football wingers
Hungarian Jews who died in the Holocaust
Hungarian civilians killed in World War II
Hungarian World War II forced labourers